Zavičaj (Serbian for homeland) is the twelfth studio album by Zdravko Čolić, released in 2006. The album was not released and distributed by a conventional record label, but through Telekom Srbija's mobile division mt:s. With the CD purchase, the buyer also got RSD100 prepaid mobile phone card as well as a one-month free internet coupon. In the first two days after release, the album sold more than 100,000 copies.

Track listing
 Mangupska (Rascal Song)
 Hajmo negdje nasamo (Let's Go Somewhere To Be Alone)
 Zavičaj (Homeland)
 Bembaša (Bimbashi)
 Svadbarskim sokakom (Down The Wedding Street)
 Rakija (Brandy)
 Sto puta (A Hundred Times)
 Vrijeme (Time)
 Kod tri bijesna brata (At The Three Angry Brother's Place)
 Kao moja mati (Like My Mother)
 Merak mi je (I Like It)
 Sačuvaj me, Bože, njene ljubavi (Spare Me Her Love, God)
 Nevjera (Disloyalty)
 Anđela (Angela)

References

2006 albums
Zdravko Čolić albums